In spite of restrictions on freedom of association, particularly in the decades since the death of Mao Zedong in 1976, there have been incidents of protest and dissent in China. Among the most notable of these were the 1959 Tibetan uprising against Chinese Communist Party (CCP) rule, the 1989 Tiananmen Square protests, which were put down with brutal military force, the 25 April 1999 demonstration by 10,000 Falun Gong practitioners at Zhongnanhai, and the 2022 protests against COVID-19 lockdowns. Protesters and dissidents in China espouse a wide variety of grievances, including corruption, forced evictions, unpaid wages, human rights abuses, environmental degradation, ethnic protests, petitioning for religious freedom and civil liberties, protests against one-party rule, as well as nationalist protests against foreign countries.

The number of annual protests has grown steadily since the early 1990s, from approximately 8,700 "mass group incidents" in 1993 to over 87,000 in 2005. In 2006, the Chinese Academy of Social Sciences estimated the number of annual mass incidents to exceed 90,000, and Chinese sociology professor Sun Liping estimated 180,000 incidents in 2010. Mass incidents are defined broadly as "planned or impromptu gathering that forms because of internal contradictions", and can include public speeches or demonstrations, physical clashes, public airings of grievances, and other group behaviors that are seen as disrupting social stability.

Despite the increase in protests, some scholars have argued that they may not pose an existential threat to CCP rule because they lack "connective tissue"; the preponderance of protests in China are aimed at local-level officials, and only a select few dissident movements seek systemic change. In a study conducted by Chinese academic Li Yao, released in 2017, the majority of protests which were non-controversial did not receive much if any negative police action, which is to say police may have been present but in no more capacity than Western police would be attending to a protest/mass gathering event. The idea that Chinese do not protest or would be brutally repressed for any kind of political action does not seem to be supported by existing data. In addition, it was noted at times that the national government uses these protests as a barometer to test local officials' response to the citizens under their care.

Legal framework

According to the 1947 Constitution of the Republic of China, article 13 states that "the people shall have freedom of assembly and association." This practice was constrained from 1948 to 1991 due to the usage of the Temporary Provisions against the Communist Rebellion, which nullified civil liberties at that time.

The Constitution of the People's Republic of China asserts that "citizens of the People's Republic of China enjoy freedom of speech, of the press, of assembly, of association, of procession, and of demonstration." In practice, however, the practice of these rights are tightly proscribed, generally under the auspices of maintaining "social stability." While guaranteeing freedoms, the constitution also declares it to be the duty of Chinese citizens to "fight against those forces and elements [...] that are hostile to China's socialist system and try to undermine it." Poorly defined anti-subversion laws, such as article 105 of the criminal code, may be used to criminally prosecute individuals seeking to exercise the rights of assembly, free speech, or demonstration. Other citizens engaged in various forms of protest may face administrative punishment, such as sentencing to forced labor terms.

Tactics
Chinese dissidents and protesters have employed numerous different tactics to express dissatisfaction with authorities, including petitioning of local governments or appeals offices, Weiquan lawyering, demonstrations on Tiananmen Square, signing support for dissident manifestos such as Charter 08, boycotts, marches, and occasionally violent rioting.

The majority of protests in China concern local grievances, such as the corruption of county- or township-level government or CCP officials, exploitation by employers, excessive taxation, and so on. Protests targeting specific, local grievances, and where citizens propose actionable remedies, are more likely to succeed than alternative forms of protests.

As the rights consciousness of the Chinese populace has grown since the 1980s and 1990s, a growing number of citizens have adopted semi-institutionalized forms of protest known as "rightful resistance," whereby they make use of the court system, petitioning channels, or of central government decrees and policies to bring grievances against local authorities. Such protests are occasionally successful, but are often frustrated if authorities determine that it is not in the party's interest to heed protesters' demands.

The failure of semi-institutionalized means of protest can eventually lead citizens to adopt more overt and public forms of resistance, such as sit-ins, picketing, coordinated hunger strikes, or marches. When petitioning to local authorities fails, many citizens take their grievances to the capital in Beijing, occasionally staging demonstrations in Tiananmen Square.

In isolated instances disaffected citizens have turned to rioting, bombings of government buildings and related targets, or suicide as a form of protest. In December 2011, residents of the village of Wukan expelled CCP authorities following land requisition protests.

In the case of pro-nationalist protests, citizens have engaged in boycotts against foreign goods or companies, officially sanctioned marches, and occasionally targeted foreign embassies for violence.

Technology has become an increasingly important part of the arsenal of Chinese protesters and dissidents. Some protests occur almost entirely in the realm of online activism and engagement, taking the form of citizens signing online petitions, issuing statements online rejecting the CCP, of signing support for dissident manifestos like Charter 08. Cyber-vigilantes make use of the internet to publicize and publicly shame government officials and others who are perceived as corrupt, have committed human rights abuses, or have otherwise offended collective values. SMS text messages have also been used to organize and coordinate protests.

Rural protests
An estimated 65 percent of the 180,000 annual "mass incidents" in China stem from grievances over forced land requisitions, whereby government authorities—often in collusion with private developers—seize land from villages with little to no compensation. Since 2005, surveys have indicated a steady increase in the number of forced land requisitions. Every year, local government expropriates the land of approximately 4 million rural Chinese citizens. 43 percent of villagers surveys across China report being the victims of land grabs. In most instances, the land is then sold to private developers at an average cost of 40x higher per acre than the government paid to the villagers.

Labor protests
Labor protests in China's industrial sector are common, as migrant workers resist low wages or poor working conditions. There are trade unions in China, but they supposedly consist of state cadres. Trade unions are supposedly an extension of the CCP in companies, factories and general management.

In March 2010, employees of the Chinese Honda plant went on a strike, demanding a pay raise and a self-chosen union. One employee mentioned that Honda had been willing to compromise, but the government in Guangdong had spoken out against wage increases, fearing that similar demands could be made in other companies. According to media reports, the number of workers' strikes rose to a record level in 2015. The China Labor Bulletin mentioned 2,509 strikes and protests by workers and employees in China. The main reason for these strikes is said to have been because of many factory closures and layoffs.

In 2011, many migrant workers did not return to their workplace in Guangzhou, in southern China, after the New Year holidays. The reason for this is said to have been that more job opportunities had been created in the hitherto poorer provinces. Thus, many no longer had to go to other areas to work and earn a living. It is said to have been 30 to 40 percent fewer migrant workers, normally 10 to 15 percent, although China's authorities had raised the minimum wages. As a result, foreign companies moved their production facilities to Southeast Asia into "cheaper" provinces or even abroad. China experts at the investment bank Credit Suisse called this change a "historic turning point" both for China's economy and possibly for the world.

Pro-democracy protests

Democracy Wall

The Democracy Wall movement of November 1978 to spring 1981 is usually regarded as the beginning of China's contemporary democracy movement. The Democracy Wall movement focused on the elimination of bureaucratism and the bureaucratic class.  Although Democracy Wall participants agreed that "democracy" was the means to resolve this conflict between the bureaucratic class and the people, the nature of the proposed democratic institutions was a major source of disagreement. A majority of participants in the movement favored viewed the movement as part of a struggle between correct and incorrect notions of Marxism. Many participants advocated classical Marxist views that drew on the Paris Commune for inspiration. The Democracy Wall movement also included non-Marxists and anti-Marxists, although these participants were a minority. Demands for "democracy" were frequent but without an agreed-upon meaning. Participants in the movement variously associated the concept of democracy with socialism, communism, liberal democracy, capitalism, and Christianity. They drew on a diverse range of intellectual resources "ranging from classical Marxist and socialist traditions to Enlightenment philosophers, [socialist] experiments in Yugoslavia, and Western liberal democracy." Significant documents of the Democracy Wall movement include The Fifth Modernization manifesto by Wei Jingsheng.

1986 student demonstrations

1989 Tiananmen Square protests and massacre

In the Spring of 1989, hundreds of thousands of students, laborers and others gathered in Tiananmen Square to mourn the death of CCP General Secretary Hu Yaobang. The non-violent gathering soon morphed into a riot advocating greater transparency, reform, and eventually, democracy. In the early morning of 4 June 1989, the People's Liberation Army was mobilized to disperse the crowds by using weapons to open fire on the crowd, killing several hundred to thousands of Chinese citizens.

2011 Chinese pro-democracy protests 

In February 2011, a month of pro-democracy protests took place in Beijing, inspired by the Tunisian Revolution.

2011 Wukan protests 

In 2011, the village of Wukan temporarily threw out its unelected leaders, and elected its leadership for a period.

2022 Sitong Bridge protest

On 13 October 2022, a protest on Sitong Bridge in Beijing was held by a protestor who posted a banner on the bridge and burnt tyres. Information on the protest spread rapidly on online social media and was quickly censored by Chinese authorities. Similar protest slogans subsequently appeared as graffiti in other cities in China and via AirDrop.

2022 protests against COVID-19 lockdowns 

In November 2022, following the 2022 Ürümqi fire, solidarity protests against the government's Zero-COVID policies erupted in Ürümqi and across the country. In Shanghai, hundreds chanted "Step down, Xi Jinping! Step down, Communist Party!"

Falun Gong

Among the most vocal and consistent opponents of the CCP rule in the last decade are practitioners of Falun Gong. Falun Gong is a qigong-based practise of meditation with a moral philosophy based on Buddhist traditions. It was popularized in China in the 1990s, and by 1999, it was estimated to have 70 million practitioners.

Some among the CCP's leadership were wary of the group's popularity, independence from the state, and spiritual philosophy, and from 1996 to 1999, the practise faced varying degrees of harassment from CCP authorities and Public Security Bureaus and criticism in the state-run media. Falun Gong practitioners responded to media criticism by picketing local government or media offices, and were often successful in gaining retractions. One such demonstration in April 1999 was broken up by security forces in Tianjin, and several dozen Falun Gong practitioners were beaten and arrested. In response, on 25 April Falun Gong mobilised the largest demonstration in China since 1989, gathering silently outside the Zhongnanhai central government compound to request official recognition and an end to the escalating harassment against them. Falun Gong representatives met with Premier Zhu Rongji, and reached an agreement. Party General Secretary Jiang Zemin reportedly criticized Zhu for being "too soft," however, and ordered that Falun Gong be defeated. On 20 July 1999, the CCP leadership initiated a campaign to eradicate the group through a combination of propaganda, imprisonment, torture, and other coercive methods.

In the first two years of the crackdown, Falun Gong practitioners in China responded by petitioning local, provincial, and national appeals offices. Efforts at petitioning were often met with imprisonment, leading the group to shift tactics by staging daily, non-violent demonstrations in Tiananmen Square. These demonstrations, which typically involved practitioners holding banners or staging meditation sit-ins, were broken up, often violently, by security agents. By late 2001, Falun Gong largely abandoned protests in Tiananmen Square, but continued a quiet resistance against the persecution campaign. Although the group claims to have no political orientation or ambitions, it has since 2004 actively advocated for an end to CCP rule.

Hong Kong 

The 2019–20 Hong Kong protests convinced Hong Kong leader Carrie Lam to suspend a bill that would have made it legal for Hong Kong to extradite criminal suspects to the mainland. The street protests were massive, with the 16 June protest consisting of 5 percent (according to the police) or 30 percent (according to organisers) of the full population of Hong Kong. Protestors objected to the proposed bill on the grounds that the mainland PRC "justice system is marked by torture, forced confessions, arbitrary detentions and unfair trials."

Online protests

Chinese dissidents have increasingly embraced the internet as a means of expressing and organizing opposition to the government or CCP leadership, and technology tools have become a principle way for Chinese citizens to spread otherwise censored news and information. Although the internet in China is subject to severe censorship and surveillance, the relative anonymity and security in number that it offers has made it a preferred forum for expressing dissenting views and opinions.

A number of prominent Chinese dissidents, scholars, and rights defenders, and artists maintain blogs to which they post essays and criticisms of the CCP. One innovative use of the internet as a medium for protest was a video created by artist Ai Weiwei, in which different Chinese citizens were filmed reading the names of victims from the 2008 Sichuan earthquake, who died due to poor school construction.

Several high-profile instances of human rights abuses have sparked online protests. The 2009 arrest of 21-year-old Deng Yujiao, who killed a local government official in self-defense when he tried to sexually assault her, sparked outrage among Chinese netizens, resulting in some four million posts online. Charges against Deng were eventually dropped in response to the outcry.

Internet vigilantes dubbed "human flesh search engines" seek to exact justice against corrupt authorities or other individuals by posting personal information about the offenders, and inviting the public to use this information to humiliate and shame them.

In 2008, a pro-democracy manifesto authored by a group of intellectuals titled Charter 08 circulated online, eventually collecting approximately 10,000 signatures and earning one of its authors, Liu Xiaobo, a Nobel Peace Prize. The Falun Gong-affiliated Epoch Times maintains a website that allows Chinese citizens to post anonymous, symbolic withdrawals from the CCP, Communist Youth League, or Young Pioneers. The site claims tens of millions of people have posted such statements, though the number is not independently verified.

Anti-Japanese protests

The 2005 anti-Japanese demonstrations showcased anti-Japanese sentiment. These anti-Japan protests demonstrated the mood of the Chinese against Japan. These protests broke out in China and spread from Beijing to the southern province Guangdong. Demonstrators are said to have been furious about Japanese war history books and have thrown stones at the Japanese embassy in Beijing. More than 10,000 Chinese are said to have joined a rally in Beijing and protested against the distortion of Japan's wartime past and against Tokyo's candidacy for a permanent seat on the UN Security Council. Several thousand Chinese are said to have marched through Beijing and called for a boycott of Japanese goods.

Government's responses
Chinese authorities have pursued a variety of strategies to quell protests. This includes the use of coercive measures of suppression, censorship, the imprisonment or "re-education through labor" of dissidents and activists, and the creation of a vast domestic security apparatus. Authorities have also attempted in some cases to address the causes of frustrations, such as by launching anti-corruption drives, seeking to reduce income inequality in rural areas and developing impartial mechanisms for dispute resolution via the courts or state arbitration/mediation. For example, of the nearly 700,000 labor disputes in 2008 that were subject to court or state arbitration/mediation just under 300,000 resulted in pro-labor decision, just under 300,000 in split decisions and the remainder in pro-business decisions.

See also
 Siege of Wukan, 2011
 Zhejiang solar panel plant protest, 2011
Mass incidents in China

References 

 
Riots and civil disorder in China